James Dey (14 October 1869 – 8 May 1946) was an English prelate of the Roman Catholic Church. He served as the Bishop of the Forces from 1935 to 1946.

Born in Walsall on 14 October 1869, he was ordained to the priesthood on 17 February 1894. He was appointed the Bishop of the Forces and Titular Bishop of Sebastopolis in Armenia by the Holy See on 13 April 1935.

His consecration to the Episcopate took place on 2 June 1935, the principal consecrator was Cardinal Arthur Hinsley, Archbishop of Westminster, and the principal co-consecrators were Archbishop Thomas Leighton Williams of Birmingham and Bishop Ambrose James Moriarty of Shrewsbury.

He died in office on 8 May 1946, aged 76.

References

External links
 The Right Rev. James Dey, D.S.O. (Cotton College Website)

1869 births
1946 deaths
20th-century Roman Catholic bishops in England
People from Walsall
Roman Catholic bishops of the Forces